Igreja Matriz de Pavia is a church in Portugal. It is classified as a National Monument.

Pavia
National monuments in Évora District